Morzin Palace is a baroque palace in Malá Strana, Prague, named after the Morzin family for whom it was built.

History
The previous town houses on the site were sold by Maximilian von Wallenstein to the Morzin family in 1668. In 1713 Václav Morzin (1676–1737) commissioned  Jan Blažej Santini-Aichel to create one palace on the site, and building work was completed the following year. It remained in the Morzin family until 1881.

Embassy of Romania
The Embassy of Romania in Prague is currently located at Morzin Palace, opposite the Italian Embassy. Its facade features two columns in the shape of chained Moors, a pun on the name of the building.

See also
The Morzin palace in Dolní Lukavice
Romanian diplomatic missions

References

Czech Republic–Romania relations
Buildings and structures completed in 1714
Jan Santini Aichel buildings
Romania
Prague
Malá Strana
Morzin family
Palaces in Prague
1714 establishments in the Holy Roman Empire
Czechoslovakia–Romania relations